The Supermarine B.12/36 was a British prototype four-engine heavy bomber design that was destroyed by enemy action before completion during the Second World War.

Design and development

In 1936 the Air Ministry issued specification B12/36, its first for a four-engined heavy bomber for the Royal Air Force. Supermarine, among others, were invited to tender a design.

Supermarine's design, the Type 316, was a single-spar, mid-wing aircraft; the leading edge was swept back but the trailing edge was straight. Bombs were carried in both the wings and the fuselage and defensive armament was in three turrets. Of the different powerplants suggested for the Type 316, there were three of more than 1,000 hp (746 kW): the Rolls-Royce Merlin, the Bristol Hercules radial engine and the Napier Dagger.

The different proposals were considered by the Air Ministry in late 1936. The 316 was initially low down in the list of preferred designs behind Vickers, Boulton Paul and Armstrong Whitworth but by January 1937 it had been selected as the preferred choice. Both the Air Ministry and Supermarine initiated changes to the design, giving it a larger wing area and a twin tail unit. This revised design was the Type 317 and two prototypes with Hercules engines were ordered on 22 March 1937.

The Short S.29 was considered as a backup but re-design work was requested and in June the Air Ministry decided to order prototypes of that also. The death of the 316's chief designer R. J. Mitchell had made the Supermarine design riskier.

To offer the greater use of possible engines, Supermarine continued with design work for a Merlin engined version – the Type 318. In July 1937 Supermarine were told to stop work on the 318 to concentrate on the 317.

While still under construction, the two prototypes and the construction plans were effectively lost when the Supermarine Works at Woolston was bombed by the Luftwaffe on 26 September 1940. The Air Ministry formally cancelled the order in November.

The Short S.29 was accepted into service as the Short Stirling and was the principal British four-engine heavy bomber until eclipsed by the Handley Page Halifax and Avro Lancaster, both coming out of specification B13/36 for a twin-engined bomber.

Notes and references

 RJ Mitchell. A life in aviation accessed 13 March 2008
 Buttler, Tony British Secret Projects: Fighters & Bombers 1935-1950 Midland Publishing.

External links
Artist's impression of the Supermarine 318

1930s British bomber aircraft
B.12 36
Mid-wing aircraft